Wailadmiki Shylla is a member of Meghalaya Legislative Assembly (MLA) from Jowai constituency. He won the election in 2018, defeating UDP candidate Moonlight Pariat.

Shylla is the brother-in-law of the Meghalaya minister Sniawbhalang Dhar.

References 

Meghalaya MLAs 2018–2023

1991 births
Living people